Irene Mervyn Parnicott Pike, Baroness Pike,  (16 September 1918 – 11 January 2004) was a British Conservative politician. The name by which she came to be known, Mervyn, had been the name of her father's best friend, who was to have been her godfather; when he was killed in action, a few days before she was born, her father decided that the baby would take his name.

Early life 
Born in Castleford, Yorkshire, into a family of Castleford pottery manufacturers, Pike was educated at Hunmanby Hall (East Riding of Yorkshire) and at Reading University and served with the Women's Auxiliary Air Force during World War II. She was managing director of a firm of pottery manufacturers.

Career 
Pike contested Pontefract in 1951 and Leek in 1955 without success. She was elected Member of Parliament (MP) for Melton at a by-election in December 1956. She held several positions including Assistant Postmaster-General from 1959 to 1963, joint Under-Secretary of State for the Home Department from 1963 to 1964 and Chair of the WRVS from 1974 to 1981 and the Broadcasting Complaints Commission from 1981 to 1985.

Awards 
Pike was created a life peer on 15 May 1974 as Baroness Pike, of Melton in the County of Leicestershire, and was appointed a Dame Commander of the Order of the British Empire (DBE) in the 1981 Birthday Honours.

Death 
She died in 2004, unmarried, at a nursing home in Kelso, Scottish Borders, aged 85, from pneumonia following a stroke.

References

External links
Announcement of Pike's death in the House of Lords – minutes of proceedings, 13 January 2004

1918 births
2004 deaths
Alumni of the University of Reading
British women in World War II
Conservative Party (UK) MPs for English constituencies
Female members of the Parliament of the United Kingdom for English constituencies
Conservative Party (UK) life peers
Dames Commander of the Order of the British Empire
Politicians from Castleford
Life peeresses created by Elizabeth II
UK MPs 1955–1959
UK MPs 1959–1964
UK MPs 1964–1966
UK MPs 1966–1970
UK MPs 1970–1974
UK MPs who were granted peerages
20th-century British women politicians
Ministers in the Macmillan and Douglas-Home governments, 1957–1964
20th-century English women
20th-century English people